Dingell is a surname. Notable people with the surname include:

Christopher D. Dingell (born 1957), American judge and politician
John Dingell Sr. (1894–1955), American newspaperman, businessman, and politician
John Dingell (1926–2019), American lawyer and politician, son of John Sr.
Debbie Dingell (born 1954), American politician, widow of John Jr.